Irene in Trouble is a 1953 Austrian-Yugoslav romantic comedy film directed by E. W. Emo and starring Bruni Löbel, Friedl Czepa, and Walter Giller.

Cast

References

Bibliography

External links 
 

1953 films
1953 romantic comedy films
Austrian romantic comedy films
1950s German-language films
Films directed by E. W. Emo
Films set in Salzburg
Sascha-Film films
Yugoslav romantic comedy films
Austrian black-and-white films
Yugoslav black-and-white films